Appalachian Council may be:
 Appalachian Council (Tennessee)
 Appalachian Council (Virginia)